Abi Roach (born 1983 or 1984) is a Canadian cannabis entrepreneur and advocate for the reform of cannabis in Ontario and Canada.

Early life 

Career 
Roach is a Canadian cannabis entrepreneur. She has owned the Cannabis retail outlet Roach-o-Rama, and since 2012, a cannabis-tourism business in Saint Ann, Jamaica. She was the publisher of the (now defunct) Spliff free Cannabis news magazine. 

Roach was the owner-operator of the Kensington Market, Toronto-based cannabis lounge Hotbox Cafe from 2003 until she sold the business to Friendly Stranger Holdings Corp in 2020. The business was North America's longest running Cannabis-consumption business space and opened the day after ownership of cannabis was decriminalised in Ontario.

Roach is an advocate for cannabis law reform, and in 2016 was an organiser for the Cannabis Friendly Business Association. In November 2017, she spoke before a Government of Ontario committee, advocating for a relaxation of laws that govern where cannabis can be consumed. Roach was critical of the Government of Ontario's distribution of Cannabis licences via a lottery system, before taking a job at the government's Ontario Cannabis Retail Corporation.

Personal life 
In 2019, Roach lives in Kensington Market, Toronto.

See also 

 Cannabis in Ontario
 Cannabis in Canada
 Cannabis Act

References

External links 

 Abi Roach - Twitter
 Spliff Magazine (2013 archive)

Living people
1980s births
Canadian women business executives
Canadian company founders
Canadian magazine publishers (people)
Canadian magazine founders
Cannabis activists
Activists from Toronto
Businesspeople from Toronto
Cannabis law reform in Canada